Thurstaston railway station was a station on the single track Hooton to West Kirby branch of the Birkenhead Railway, on the Wirral Peninsula, England. The station served the village of Thurstaston situated to the north east.

History
The Birkenhead Railway, owned jointly by the Great Western Railway (GWR) and London and North Western Railway (LNWR), had initially opened a branch line from Hooton to Parkgate in 1866. An extension to West Kirby was completed twenty years later, including Thurstaston station which opened on 19 April 1886.
Station Road was constructed from land donated by local landowners Thomas Ismay and the Glegg family to provide access from the village to Thurstaston station.

World War II
During the Second World War the line was used for the transportation of munitions. Heavy anti-aircraft gun emplacements were built on land to the west of the station, which have since been grassed over.

Closure
Despite regular seasonal tourist use of the station, passenger numbers generally remained low. On 1 February 1954 the station was closed to passengers, although the line itself remained open to passenger trains for another two years. The track continued to be used for freight transportation and driver training for another eight years, closing on 7 May 1962. The tracks were lifted two years later.

Wirral Country Park
The route became the Wirral Way footpath and part of Wirral Country Park in 1973, which was the first such designated site in Britain. Unlike most of the stations on the line, the two platforms are still in situ, though the southbound platform is largely obscured by undergrowth. The station buildings have been demolished.

References

Further reading

External links

Disused railway stations in the Metropolitan Borough of Wirral
Former Birkenhead Railway stations
Railway stations in Great Britain opened in 1886
Railway stations in Great Britain closed in 1954